CNT may refer to:

Organized labor
 Confederación Nacional del Trabajo (CNT), the National Confederation of Labor, a Spanish confederation of anarcho-syndicalist labor unions
 Central Nacional de Trabajadores (CNT), the National Workers' Central (Paraguay), a national trade union center in Paraguay
 Confédération nationale du travail (CNT-F), the National Confederation of Labour, a French anarcho-syndicalist union
 Confédération Nigérienne du Travail, the Nigerien Confederation of Labour, a trade union federation in Niger
 Plenario Intersindical de Trabajadores - Convención Nacional de Trabajadores PIT-CNT, a national trade union center in Uruguay

Science and technology
 Carbon nanotube, an allotrope of carbon with a cylindrical nanostructure
 Classical nucleation theory
 Computer Network Technology Corporation, an enterprise acquired by McData in January 2005; see Ultra Network Technologies
 Columbia Non-neutral Torus, a small stellarator at the Columbia University Plasma Physics Laboratory in New York City

Television
 Central Nacional de Televisão (CNT), or Central National Television, a Brazilian television network in Curitiba/Paraná, Brazil
 CNT EP, the public telecommunications company in Ecuador
 Conglomerated National Television, a fictional television network in HD Universe of Grand Theft Auto series.

Other uses
 CN Telecommunications, the former telecommunications unit of Canadian National Railway
 Confectionery, news and tobacco, a retail sector often served by small booths or newsagents
 Cantiere Navale Triestino (CNT), an Austro-Hungarian, later Italian, shipbuilding company founded in 1908 and renamed Cantieri Riuniti dell' Adriatico (CRDA) Monfalcone in 1929
 Commission for New Towns, a former planning and development agency in the UK.
 Center for Neighborhood Technology, an American non-profit organization committed to sustainable development and livable urban communities
 C*nt (Cunt), a swear word